Equality Florida is a political advocacy group that advocates for civil rights and protections for lesbian, gay, bisexual, transgender, and queer (LGBTQ) residents of the U.S. state of Florida.

Equality Florida consists of two organizations - Equality Florida Institute, Inc., the 501(c)(3) educational charity and Equality Florida Action, Inc., the 501(c)(4) advocacy organization. Together with over 300,000 supporters, these organizations form the largest civil rights organization dedicated to securing full equality for Florida's LGBTQ community.

Equality Florida has always existed in a hostile political climate, carving out victories despite strong opposition. Over 60% of Floridians are protected from anti-LGBTQ discrimination thanks to more than 200 local non-discrimination, safe schools, and domestic partnership policies passed since Equality Florida's inception.

In addition to their work in Tallahassee, they work with local partners, providing resources and helping to build coalitions that have passed pro-equality laws across the state. Equality Florida provides leadership trainings, volunteer opportunities, and sponsorship opportunities to engage and grow the LGBTQ and ally communities involved in the fight for LGBTQ equality.

Equality Florida has been ranked a top-rated non-profit by Great Nonprofits, Guidestar, and Charity Navigator.

History 
Equality Florida Institute, Inc. formed in 1997 by Nadine Smith and Stratton Pollitzer as Governor Jeb Bush took office and Florida's state government made a hard turn to the right. Smith, a former journalist, served as one of the four national co-chairs on the 1993 March on Washington. Smith also led the movement to enact the St. Petersburg Human Rights Ordinance which was passed in January 2002.

Equality Florida Action, Inc. was formed in 2014 and along with its predecessor organization Equality Florida Inc., (founded in 1999) has advocated for pro-LGBTQ legislation and defeated every piece of anti-LGBTQ legislation filed in Tallahassee since its inception. They also played a key leadership role in overturning Florida's ban on gay and lesbian adoption, which was struck down in 2015 and repealed in 2015.
In 2014, The National Center for Lesbian Rights and Equality Florida combined to file a lawsuit to challenge Florida's 2008 marriage ban for same-sex couples. On January 5, 2015, a Miami-Dade Circuit Judge lifted the ban that allowed for marriage equality.

TransAction 
Equality Florida's Transgender Inclusion Initiative, known as TransAction Florida, exists to grow grassroots engagement and influence state public policy. Headed by Equality Florida Director of Transgender Equality, Gina Duncan, the TransAction Florida Network has now grown to 80 members since its inception in 2014.

Equality Florida TransAction's transgender inclusion education efforts have expanded from conducting workshops with major Florida employers to training media, law enforcement, health care and the faith community. In doing so, creating a broader base of understanding and multi-level support from societal institutions which interface with the transgender community.

TransAction has also been highly engaged in public policy issues, supporting fully inclusive human rights ordinances across Florida and Equality Florida's statewide non-discrimination bill, the Florida Competitive Workforce Act.

Equality Means Business 
Equality Means Business was formed by Equality Florida to spotlight major employers in Florida that have adopted comprehensive LGBTQ non-discrimination policies.

By highlighting employers who have respect for diversity as a core value, Equality Means Business encourages and provides resources to Florida employers who understand that diversity brings skills, perspective, and other assets that essential to establishing a competitive workforce.

Equality Florida believes that setting the standard with comprehensive policies is the best way to strengthen Florida's reputation in recruiting and retaining a talented workforce.

Equality Means business has an Advisory Board, made up of companies and individuals who are highly respected for their commitment to creating a safe and productive workplace for all individuals regardless of sexual orientation and gender identity.

Safe and Healthy Schools 
Equality Florida's Safe and Healthy Schools Program was created in the aftermath of the Pulse massacre in Orlando in an effort to uproot anti-LGBTQ animosity that leads to harassment, discrimination and violence.

The program aims to create a culture of inclusion while countering the bullying, harassment, social isolation, and bigotry that dramatically increase risk factors for LGBTQ (lesbian, gay, bisexual, transgender, and questioning) students.

The goal of the program is for each of Florida's 67 school districts to adopt comprehensive, nationally recognized best practices for meeting the needs of LGBTQ students and in doing so build a model that can be replicated nationwide.

As of Fall 2018, the program has worked with over 60 school districts across the state, and has delivered LGBTQ+ sensitivity and best practice professional development training to over 12,000 principals, assistant principals, as well as school counselors, social workers, and school psychologists.

#HonorThemWithAction 

In the early morning hours on June 12, after the Orlando nightclub shooting, Equality Florida said that they would do everything they could to take care of the survivors of the shooting and the victims’ families and that they would make sure all money they raised went directly to those most impacted by the shooting. 120,000+ people raised over $9.5 million for the survivors and victims’ families on a GoFundMe fundraiser by Equality Florida.

#HonorThemWithAction is a national campaign that began as a way for individuals to share on social media how they were honoring the victims, survivors and families of Pulse by taking actions in their community to combat discrimination and violence against LGBTQ+ and Latinx people.

Social Media Impact 
Since 2016, millions of people have been reached by #HonorThemWithAction, including over 147 million alone in 2017 alone. Individuals, organizations, and companies across the United States have used the hashtag to post how they were actively challenging anti-LGBTQ+ discrimination, resisting violence, and giving back to their communities.

The National Equality March made #HonorThemWithAction their slogan in 2017. The Human Rights Campaign, the National LGBTQ Task Force, Gays Against Guns and GLAAD are among national organizations that have used #HonorThemWithAction to help amplify the message.
The effort has also been embraced by elected officials including Speaker Nancy Pelosi and Senator Elizabeth Warren as well as celebrities including George Takei, RuPaul, U2 and Sara Ramirez. Major league sports teams Miami Heat and the Tampa Bay Rays also used the hashtag to raise awareness about the movement. The Tampa Bay Rays created a video they shared on social media and played at their game during Pride Night.

HIV Advocacy 
The state of Florida continues to be one of the leading states on HIV transmissions. As the state's largest LGBTQ advocacy organization, Equality Florida is committed to addressing the public health need through their HIV Advocacy Project.

Equality Florida's HIV Advocacy Project consists of a statewide public education campaign to inform residents of the dangers and injustice of our state's HIV-specific laws, emphasizing how these laws are a disincentive to people seeking testing and treatment, and they promote new transmissions and work against public health. The aim is to modernize Florida's HIV laws to end to unjust legal treatment and stigmatization by the government.

As part of their Education Campaign, Equality Florida focuses on outreach to communities of color, with a special emphasis on black and Latino faith-based communities. They promote awareness of modernizing HIV laws and the disproportionate impact of HIV criminal laws on people of color, especially black transgender women.

Equality Florida is actively engaged with a broad-based coalition of organizations working towards modernizing HIV laws in Florida. Along with the American Civil Liberties Union of Florida, Lambda Legal, SAVE, the Southern Poverty Law Center, AIDS Healthcare Foundation, and the Sero Project, Equality Florida works with fellow progressive organizations committed to combating the stigma of HIV in Florida.

Equality Florida's HIV Advocacy Project is made possible in part through a grant from the AIDS United Foundation and Elton John AIDS Foundation.

Equality Florida Action PAC 
In 2007, Equality Florida formed the Equality Florida Action PAC to make direct candidate endorsements for the strongest champions of Florida's LGBTQ community. Equality Florida Action PAC quickly became the largest organization in Florida devoted to electing pro-equality candidates to all levels of government.

Each election cycle, Equality Florida Action PAC endorsements are a valuable resource for hundreds of thousands of Florida voters. In the 2018 election cycle, 74% of the Equality Florida Action PAC's endorsed candidates were elected to office.

Galas 
Equality Florida hosts annual galas in Gainesville, Key West, Fort Lauderdale, Tampa, Miami, Palm Beach, Orlando, Tallahassee, St. Pete, Jacksonville and Sarasota to raise funds for the organization's advocacy actions. The Institute arm also presents awards to local individuals who have contributed to advancing equality in the local or state areas.

See also
 Cyberstalking legislation
 Florida Amendment 2
 LGBT history in Florida
 LGBT rights in Florida
 Recognition of same-sex unions in Florida

References

External links
 

1997 establishments in Florida
LGBT political advocacy groups in Florida
Non-profit organizations based in Florida
Organizations established in 1997
501(c)(4) nonprofit organizations
Organizations based in St. Petersburg, Florida